Saffo, ossia I riti d'Apollo Leucadio is a 1794 Italian language opera by Mayr for La Fenice, Venice. The cast featured the castrato Girolamo Crescentini.

Recordings
 Saffo, conducted by Franz Hauk, Naxos

References

Operas
1794 operas
Operas by Simon Mayr
Cultural depictions of Sappho